Bipoonops is a genus of spiders in the family Oonopidae. It was first described in 2014 by Bolzern. , it contains 3 species, all from Ecuador.

References

Oonopidae
Araneomorphae genera
Spiders of South America